SBU may refer to:

Military and defense 

 Security Service of Ukraine or Sluzhba Bezpeky Ukrayiny (SBU)
 Sensitive but unclassified, a U.S. designation of information
 Vought SBU Corsair, an aircraft
 Special Boarding Unit, Japanese forces unit

Universities 
 San Beda University, Manila, Philippines
 Sarala Birla University, Jharkhand, India
 Shahid Beheshti University, Tehran, Iran
 Southwest Baptist University,  Missouri, US
 Stony Brook University, New York, US

Business 
 Strategic business unit
 Stanbic Bank Uganda Limited
 Siberian Business Union, a Russian holding company

Technologies 
 Standard Build Unit in Linux From Scratch
 Sense and Braking Unit, an end-of-train device

Other uses 
 SBU, the National Rail station code for Southbury railway station, London, England
 Swedish Agency for Health Technology Assessment and Assessment of Social Services
 Songbei District, a district of Harbin, China